Elena Brioukhovets and Eugenia Maniokova were the defending champions, but Brioukhovets chose to compete at Hamburg during the same week. Maniokova teamed up with Radka Bobková and lost in the semifinals to Laura Golarsa and Ann Grossman.

Alexia Dechaume and Florencia Labat won the title by defeating Golarsa and Grossman 6–2, 7–5 in the final.

Seeds

Draw

Draw

References

External links
 Official results archive (ITF)
 Official results archive (WTA)

Ilva Trophy
1991 WTA Tour